Olivier Dame-Malka (born May 30, 1990) is a Canadian-born French professional ice hockey defenceman. He is currently playing with Rødovre Mighty Bulls in the Metal Ligaen. Internationally he plays for the French national team, and played at the 2017 World Championship. Dame-Malka is Jewish, and was born in Montreal, Quebec, Canada.

Playing career
Dame-Malka played four seasons (2007–2011) in the Quebec Major Junior Hockey League (QMJHL), scoring 33 goals and 81 assists for 114 points, and earning 376 penalty minutes in 226 games played.

On December 31, 2012, the Bakersfield Condors of the ECHL traded Dame-Malka to the Toledo Walleye in exchange for defenceman Dale Warkentin and forward Max Campbell. 

He played for Team Canada at the 2013 Maccabiah Games in Israel, where they won a gold medal.

After four seasons in Europe, spending the majority of his tenure in the Ligue Magnus, Dame-Malka returned to North America in agreeing to a second stint with the Florida Everblades of the ECHL on September 26, 2018. In the 2018–19 season, Dame-Malka registered 6 assists in 20 games with the Everblades, before opting to return to France on January 16, 2019, reacquainting with the Ligue Magnus in signing for the remainder of the year with Nice hockey Côte d'Azur.

See also
List of select Jewish ice hockey players

References

External links

1990 births
Living people
Acadie–Bathurst Titan players
Les Aigles de Nice players
Bakersfield Condors (1998–2015) players
Brûleurs de Loups players
HC '05 Banská Bystrica players
Canadian ice hockey defencemen
Competitors at the 2013 Maccabiah Games
Jewish Canadian sportspeople
Cape Breton Screaming Eagles players
Dragons de Rouen players
Ducs de Dijon players
Florida Everblades players
French ice hockey defencemen
Hamilton Bulldogs (AHL) players
Jewish ice hockey players
Lewiston Maineiacs players
Ontario Reign (ECHL) players
Ice hockey people from Montreal
Toledo Walleye players
Wheeling Nailers players
Canadian emigrants to France
Canadian expatriate ice hockey players in Slovakia
Canadian expatriate ice hockey players in France
Maccabiah Games competitors by sport
Maccabiah Games gold medalists for Canada
Canadian expatriate ice hockey players in the United States
Canadian expatriate ice hockey players in Denmark
Canadian expatriate ice hockey players in Romania
French expatriate ice hockey people
French expatriate sportspeople in the United States
French expatriate sportspeople in Denmark
French expatriate sportspeople in Romania
Rødovre Mighty Bulls players
Anglet Hormadi Élite players